The World Singles Champion of Champions is an event inaugurated in 2003 that is contested annually between bowlers who have won their respective national singles title.

The event was first held in 2003 at the Moama Bowling Club in Moama, Australia. Traditionally the competition favours the Southern Hemisphere players due to the fact that the Northern Hemisphere players have to travel to the event and compete on faster greens. No male player has managed to win the title a second time and the only female to achieve two wins is Jo Edwards of New Zealand.

Past winners

Men's singles

Women's singles 

+Ireland competes as one nation

See also 
World Bowls Events

References 

Bowls competitions